Benjamin Hunkins (September 10, 1810April 27, 1900) was an American politician who had a role in shaping the Wisconsin constitution.

Early life
Hunkins, born in Charleston, Vermont in 1810, was the son of settler Robert Hastings Hunkins and Hannah Emerson.

Hunkins moved to Wisconsin at the age of 28 when his father and family relocated there. He purchased land in what became Waukesha County in the town of Mentor, renamed New Berlin in 1840. The heavily timbered land was cleared by Hunkins for farming, and he cultivated the land himself. He subsequently got involved in local state politics and became one of the first representatives in the territorial legislature.

Politician and federal Indian agent 
On April 5, 1842, Hunkins was elected Chairman of New Berlin's board of supervisors. After serving as Chairman, Hunkins served on the board of supervisors in one-year periods in years 1849, 1852, 1853 and 1858.

Hunkins served in the Wisconsin Territorial House of Representatives in 1843 and 1844. He was also a delegate to the first state constitutional convention, held in 1846.

Hunkins was a federal Indian agent for the Green Bay Agency from 1855 to 1857.  He mainly worked with the Menominee tribe, trying to align the United States Government's goals with theirs. Hunkins believed he had made headway in "civilizing the tribe", and called for them to abstain from alcohol. One of his compatriots in this task was Solomon Juneau, founder of  Milwaukee, Wisconsin. Juneau died in the arms of Hunkins while visiting the Menominee tribe. During Juneau's decline, Hunkins had acted as his "faithful friend and constant nurse". He also worked with other Native American tribes, including the Stockbridge, Munsee and Oneida tribes. Hunkins was paid $1,000 per year for the position.

In 1860 Hunkins was elected to the Wisconsin State Assembly for a one-year term. He was on the Swamp Land Committee, whose responsibility was to reimburse the general fund from the Swamp Land Fund. He was considered to be "a gentleman of decided force and marked ability - strong in mind, clear in judgment, logical in conclusion, and admirably fitted to have taken, under favorable surroundings, a prominent part in public affairs".

In 1860 upon hearing that Sherman Booth had been recaptured by federal marshals, Hunkins, who admired Booth, introduced a resolution in the Assembly that the Governor of the State should "declare war against the United States", but the speaker ruled it unconstitutional and it went no further.

Hunkins was unanimously nominated as State Senator and then was nominated as Secretary of State, but he declined the offers.

Retirement and death
After leaving state politics, Hunkins relocated to Beaver Crossing in Nebraska. At the age of 88, Hunkins "retain[ed] his mental vigor and occupi[ed] a high place in the estimation of his large circle of friends in Seward County". He died aged 90 on April 27, 1900.

Family
On February 11, 1843, Hunkins married Sophrona Hollister. They had children. Their daughter Carrie Arvilla Hunkins married the politician Eugene W. Chafin.

Legacy
The town of Hunkins, Nebraska was named for Hunkins in recognition of his service. It was eventually renamed Cordova because of issues at the post office.

References

External links

1810 births
1900 deaths
People from Orleans County, Vermont
People from Seward County, Nebraska
People from New Berlin, Wisconsin
Mayors of places in Wisconsin
Members of the Wisconsin Territorial Legislature
Members of the Wisconsin State Assembly
United States Indian agents
19th-century American politicians